Gart or GART may refer to:

People
 Joseph Gart, Provençal Jewish poet
 Gart Westerhout (1927–2012), Dutch astronomer

Other
 Graphics address remapping table, a memory structure part of the Accelerated Graphics Port specification
 Groupement des autorités responsables de transport, a French trade association for public transport providers
 The Great American Road Trip, a reality television series on NBC
 GAR transformylase, a symbol for the enzyme phosphoribosylglycinamide formyltransferase
 GART (gene), an encoding of the enzyme trifunctional purine biosynthetic protein adenosine-3